North Branch Shamokin Creek (also known as Beaver Creek) is a tributary of Shamokin Creek in Columbia County and Northumberland County, Pennsylvania, United States. The entirety of the creek is designated as an impaired waterbody due to metals from abandoned mine drainage. It is acidic, but its pH has been increasing. Underground mine complexes occur within the watershed. The creek has a permeable streambed and experiences flow loss.

A colliery historically discharged waste water into North Branch Shamokin Creek. A number of bridges have been constructed over the creek. Its drainage basin is designated as a Coldwater Fishery and a Migratory Fishery. However, the creek is incapable of supporting aquatic life, including fish and macroinvertebrates.

Course
North Branch Shamokin Creek begins in a valley near Big Mountain, in the census-designated place of Wilburton Number Two, in Conyngham Township, Columbia County. The creek flows west-southwest through the valley for more than a mile before exiting Congnyham Township and Columbia County.

Upon exiting Columbia County, North Branch Shamokin Creek enters Mount Carmel Township, Northumberland County. It continues flowing west-southwest for more than a mile before passing through two lakes and turning south-southwest. After several tenths of a mile, the creek passes near the census-designated places of Strong and Atlas. The creek turns southeast and crosses Pennsylvania Route 61. For the next few tenths of a mile, it flows alongside Pennsylvania Route 54 and Green Ridge. It then crosses Pennsylvania Route 54 and gradually turns west-southwest. Several tenths of a mile further downstream, the creek reaches its confluence with Shamokin Creek.

Hydrology

The entire length of North Branch Shamokin Creek is designated as an impaired waterbody and has poor water quality. The cause of the impairment is metals and the source is abandoned mine drainage. In addition to experiencing acidity and metal loading from acid mine drainage sources, the creek is also impacted by flow loss. The flow loss causes it to be an ephemeral stream. Between 1999 and 2003, the creek's discharge was measured four times to be between  near Mount Carmel.

One site on North Branch Shamokin Creek has been observed to have an acidic pH during low and base flow conditions, but a pH closer to neutral during high flow conditions. The water quality of the creek has improved slightly since the early 2000s. Its average pH has risen from 3.2 to 3.7. The turbidity of the creek ranged from 0 to 2 Nephelometric Turbidity Units.

It requires a 96 percent reduction to meet its total maximum daily load requirements.

Geography and geology

In one reach, North Branch Shamokin Creek passes between two ridges known as Red Ridge and Green Ridge, or Jamies Ridge. There are occurrences of coal in the creek's watershed. The creek passes through an axis perpendicular to coal strata in the area.

There are underground mine complexes throughout the watershed of North Branch Shamokin Creek. The Mid Valley Discharge is in the creek's watershed. Half of its flow is lost to the nearby Mahanoy Creek watershed. Some loss in the watershed of North Branch Shamokin Creek also reappears in the watershed of Quaker Run.

North Branch Shamokin Creek is coated with a layer of iron precipitate. It has a permeable streambed.

Watershed
The mouth of the stream is in the United States Geological Survey quadrangle of Mount Carmel. However, its source is in the quadrangle of Ashland. Communities in the creek's watershed include the borough of Marion Heights and the census-designated place of Strong.

In 2009, Northeastern ITS requested a permit to discharge stormwater into North Branch Shamokin Creek for construction purposes. When the Operation Scarlift report for Shamokin Creek was written, there were no raw sewage discharges into North Branch Shamokin Creek.

History
North Branch Shamokin Creek was entered into the Geographic Names Information System on August 2, 1979. Its identifier in the Geographic Names Information System is 1193040. The creek is also known as Beaver Creek. This name appears in Israel C. White's 1883 book The geology of the North Branch Susquehanna River Region in the six counties of Wyoming, Lackawanna, Luzerne, Columbia, Montour and Northumberland.

A colliery known as Richards Colliery historically drained waste water into North Branch Shamokin Creek. The colliery was owned by the Susquehanna Coal Company and processed 28,200 tons of coal per month.

A prestressed box beam or girders bridge carrying Pennsylvania Route 61 over North Branch Shamokin Creek in 2008 in Atlas. This bridge has been slated for preservation as part of the state of Pennsylvania's "Decade of Investment". A project to remove waste rock piles in the watershed of the creek was carried out in 2006 and 2007. The goal of the project was to improve the water quality of several Operation Scarlift discharges in the watershed, thus reducing mine pollution to the creek. In the early 1900s, the old channel of the creek was occupied by rocks and culm banks.

Biology
The drainage basin of North Branch Shamokin Creek is designated as a Coldwater Fishery and a Migratory Fishery. In 1999, electrofishing in the creek failed to turn up any fish life. It is not stocked by the Pennsylvania Fish and Boat Commission. The creek also lacks any macroinvertebrates and is incapable of supporting aquatic life due to its acidity.

Algae flourishes in a deep mine discharge in the watershed of North Branch Shamokin Creek due to a lack of predators.

See also
Locust Creek (Shamokin Creek), next tributary of Shamokin Creek going downstream
List of rivers of Pennsylvania
List of tributaries of Shamokin Creek

References

External links
Water Quality Samples for Pennsylvania – Northumberland County

Rivers of Columbia County, Pennsylvania
Rivers of Northumberland County, Pennsylvania
Tributaries of Shamokin Creek
Rivers of Pennsylvania